Pioneer Dental College & Hospital is the first and the oldest private Dental College & Hospital in Bangladesh. It was founded in 1995 at Malibag area of Dhaka. In 2007 it shifted to its present permanent campus located in Baridhara, Dhaka. This college conducted a bachelor's degree Program in Dentistry (BDS) as an affiliated dental school of Faculty of Medicine, The University of Dhaka.

See also
List of dental schools in Bangladesh

External links
Pioneer Dental College & Hospital

Hospitals in Dhaka
Dental schools in Bangladesh
Hospitals established in 1995
Private hospitals in Bangladesh